Canada Creek is a community in the Canadian province of Nova Scotia, located in Kings County.

References
  Canada Creek on Destination Nova Scotia
NS Museum of Cultural History

Communities in Kings County, Nova Scotia
General Service Areas in Nova Scotia